The Ben Shapiro Show is a daily conservative political podcast and live radio show produced by The Daily Wire and hosted by Ben Shapiro. The podcast launched in September 2015. , The Ben Shapiro Show was ranked by Podtrac as the second most popular podcast in the U.S. Westwood One began syndicating The Ben Shapiro Show podcast to radio in April 2018. In January 2019, Westwood One expanded Shapiro's one-hour podcast-to-radio program, adding a nationally syndicated two-hour live radio show, for three hours of Ben Shapiro programming daily. Apart from running Monday through Friday, the show also hosts a monthly “Sunday Special”, which features a special guest who joins Ben for a long-form (roughly hour-long) interview and discussion.

See also 
 The Daily Wire
 Political podcast
 List of daily news podcasts

References

External links
 
 

2015 podcast debuts
2018 radio programme debuts
American talk radio programs
Conservative talk radio
English-language radio programs
News podcasts
Political podcasts
Syndicated radio programs
Westwood One
Talk show podcasts
Conservative podcasts